An arsinide, arsanide, dihydridoarsenate(1−) or arsanyl compound is a chemical derivative of arsine, where one hydrogen atom is replaced with a metal or cation. The arsinide ion has formula . It can be considered as a ligand with name arsenido. Researchers are unenthusiastic about studying arsanyl compounds, because of the toxic chemicals, and their instability. The IUPAC names are arsanide and dihydridoarsenate(1−). For the ligand the name is arsanido. The neutral – group is termed arsanyl.

Formation
Alkali metal arsinides can form by bubbling arsine through a liquid ammonia solution of alkali metal such as sodium, potassium or alkaline earth metal such as calcium.

Arsinides are also formed when arsine reacts with thin layers of alkali metals.

The arsine may reduce some compounds to metals, so for example an attempt to make an indium arsinide results in metallic indium.

Reactions
When heated, metal hydrogen arsinide and metal dihydrogen arsinide compounds lose hydrogen to become a metal arsenide:

With lithium dihydrogen arsinide , it can also lose arsine  to become dilithium hydrogen arsinide :

These reactions take place even at room temperature, and result in a discolouration of the original chemical.

Sodium dihydrogen arsinide  reacts with alkyl halides RX (where X = F, Cl, Br, I, and R is alkyl) to make dialkylarsine . Potassium dihydrogen arsinide  reacts with alkyl halides to make trialkylarsine .

Sodium dihydrogen arsinide  reacts with diethyl carbonate  to yield the 2-arsaethynolate  ion, (analogous with cyanate  ion) which can be crystallised with the sodium ion  and 18-crown-6.

Arsinides react with water to yield arsine :

Potassium dihydrogen arsinide  reacts with halobenzenes , where X = Cl, Br, I (chlorobenzene , bromobenzene , iodobenzene ) to produce benzene , tetraphenyldiarsine  and triphenylarsine .

Potassium dihydrogen arsinide  reacts with a silyl halide, e.g. chlorosilane , producing trisilylarsine.

List

Related
Arsenic may be substituted by organic or other groups which can then also produce ions, for example potassium methyl arsinide (K+CH3AsH−), or by Si(CH3)3. The doubly bonded ligand =AsH (or AsH2−) is called arsinidene.

References

Arsenic compounds
Anions
Hydrides